GidG̱alang Ḵuuyas Naay (formerly Queen Charlotte Secondary) is a government-funded high school in Daajing Giids, British Columbia.  It is one of two secondary schools in School District 50 Haida Gwaii. It has a student body of around 100-150 students.

See also
Haida Gwaii

References

"Student Headcount by Grade." Education Analytics, Government of BC. n.d. Web. Accessed 5 Apr. 2021 from: https://catalogue.data.gov.bc.ca/dataset/bc-schools-student-headcount-by-grade/resource/c1a55945-8554-4058-9019-514b16178f89 (Line 81384)

External links
BC Ministry of Education school information.

High schools in British Columbia
Educational institutions in Canada with year of establishment missing